Shashi Shekhar (born 15 January 1990) is an Indian cricketer. He made his List A debut on 10 October 2019, for Bihar in the 2019–20 Vijay Hazare Trophy. He made his Twenty20 debut on 11 November 2019, for Bihar in the 2019–20 Syed Mushtaq Ali Trophy. He made his first-class debut on 17 December 2019, for Bihar in the 2019–20 Ranji Trophy.

References

External links
 

1990 births
Living people
Indian cricketers
Bihar cricketers
Place of birth missing (living people)